Homeodomain-interacting protein kinase 1 is an enzyme that, in humans is encoded by the HIPK1 gene.

Function 

The protein encoded by this gene belongs to the Ser/Thr family of protein kinases and HIPK subfamily. It phosphorylates homeodomain transcription factors and may also function as a co-repressor for homeodomain transcription factors. Alternative splicing results in four transcript variants encoding four distinct isoforms.

Interactions 

HIPK1 has been shown to interact with P53.

References

Further reading